Rollesby is a village and civil parish in the English county of Norfolk.

The villages name means 'Hrolfr's farm/settlement'.

For the purposes of local government, the parish falls within the district of Great Yarmouth.

The church of Rollesby St George is one of 124 existing round-tower churches in Norfolk and is a Grade II* listed building.

Notes 

http://kepn.nottingham.ac.uk/map/place/Norfolk/Rollesby

External links

.
Information from Genuki Norfolk on Rollesby.
St George's on the European Round Tower Churches website

Villages in Norfolk
Borough of Great Yarmouth
Civil parishes in Norfolk